Jay Lindsey Tibbs (born January 4, 1962) is a retired American Major League Baseball pitcher with a seven-year career from 1984 to 1990. Tibbs graduated from Huffman High School in 1980, the same year he was named Alabama's High School Player of the year. He went on to play for the Cincinnati Reds, Montreal Expos, Baltimore Orioles and Pittsburgh Pirates. He had two winning seasons and a career earned run average of 4.20.

References

External links

1962 births
Living people
American expatriate baseball players in Canada
Major League Baseball pitchers
Cincinnati Reds players
Montreal Expos players
Baltimore Orioles players
Pittsburgh Pirates players
Baseball players from Birmingham, Alabama
Buffalo Bisons (minor league) players
Denver Zephyrs players
Indianapolis Indians players
Jackson Mets players
Kingsport Mets players
Lynchburg Mets players
Rochester Red Wings players
Shelby Mets players
Tidewater Tides players
Wichita Aeros players